

Hungary's busiest airports by passenger traffic 

Hungary's busiest airports by passenger traffic are mentioned below according to respective year.

2010-18

2015

2014

2013

2012

References

Hu
Airports in Europe